Southrey is a village in the civil parish of Bardney in the West Lindsey district of Lincolnshire, England, and approximately  south-east from Bardney.

In the 1086 Domesday Book Southrey is listed as "Sutrei", comprising 11 households.

The little church dedicated to Saint John the Divine was built in 1898.

Southrey Wood Butterfly Reserve is managed by Butterfly Conservation. Southrey Woods cover  and are part of Bardney Limewoods, a Site of Special Scientific Interest

Southrey railway station opened in 1848 and closed in 1970.

References

External links

Villages in Lincolnshire
West Lindsey District